Bremen Street Park is an 18-acre urban park, located in East Boston, Boston, Massachusetts. The park runs parallel to both Bremen Street and the Mass Pike/Route 1A and acts as a green space buffer between Logan International Airport and the residential neighborhoods of East Boston. The park is owned, operated and patrolled by the Massachusetts Port Authority (MassPort). It is also part of the East Boston Greenway, a linear park and shared use path.

Bremen Street Park is open year-round to the public, and includes amenities such as a large public lawns, a shared use path, a spray fountain, a community garden, playgrounds, a performance amphitheater and East Boston's only dog park. Community events are also held at the park, but require a license, which are administered by MassPort.

The park is directly accessible via rapid transit on the MBTA Blue Line at Airport Station. There is no dedicated parking, but on-street parking is available along Bremen Street.

History 
Originally, the land which the park lies on was the site of a Park 'N Fly off-airport parking lot. It was purchased by the City of Boston to create a park as part of the Big Dig's environmental mitigation plan.

Conrail abandoned the section of the former Grand Junction Railroad between Lovell Street and the East Boston docks in the 1970s. The former rail yards north of Route 1A were used as a private "Park'N'Fly" lot for Logan Airport. In 1989, the Massachusetts Highway Department began proceedings to acquire the land by eminent domain as part of the Big Dig project. Since the Third Harbor Tunnel would bring additional traffic to Logan Airport, the site was to be converted to a public park, in partial restitution for the 1969 destruction of Wood Island Park for airport expansion. After a lengthy scandal over the proposed land taking (and later land swap) that sent Speaker of the Massachusetts House of Representatives Charles Flaherty to jail and implicated others including U.S. Representative Bud Shuster, Massport purchased the land outright in 2001. The park was designed by Brown, Richardson & Rowe and opened in 2007, when MassPort took over operations, maintenance and security from the Central Artery/Tunnel project.

Points of Interest

Spray Fountain and Pavilion 
Directly across from Airport Station, at the Brooks Street entrance to the park, lies a large spray fountain open to the public during the summer months. Located next to the fountain is a 1,300 square foot pavilion building which also houses rest room facilities, fountain and irrigation equipment, and park security offices.

Community Garden 
Along the north-east edge of the park, across from the Boston Public Library, lies a community garden, which offers residents a place to grow their own flowers, vegetables, and plants. Gardening season runs from late March/early April through Thanksgiving.

When originally opened in July 2007, there were 46 plots available. In October 2010, MassPort expanded the garden, adding 27 additional plots. The 73 plots are assigned first-come, first-served to people on a waiting list and distribution of the plots is governed by local coordinators.

The Boston Natural Areas Network (BNAN) helps in the setup of the garden and administers the garden funds. Gardeners pay yearly dues to cover tools, shed, maintenance, et al. Coordinators send the funds to BNAN and then get reimbursed for garden expenses.

After its first year, the garden got the Rookie of the Year award given by BNAN.

Playgrounds 
There are three playgrounds located within the park, one at the south-west terminus, next to the YMCA, and two in the center next to the spray fountain pavilion. The playgrounds are open to the public during daylight hours in the spring, summer and autumn months.

Boston Public Library 
At the northern terminus of the park lies the East Boston Branch of the Boston Public Library. The library is located at 365 Bremen Street and was opened in November 2013. The glass façade was designed to provide an open view of Bremen Street Park and in January 2014, MassPort donated $25,000 to support a year's worth of programs at the library.

East Boston YMCA 
At the south-west terminus of the park lies the East Boston YMCA, located at 215 Bremen Street. Originally built in 1909, the building was formerly the engine house where engines for locomotives were repaired. After the decline in rail use for goods transport in the 1960s, the engine house was closed and the building was used as a manufacturing facility for the Standard Box Spring Company. The building was later vacated and abandoned by the 1990s and reopened as the YMCA.

Dog Park 
In October 2014, MassPort announced the plans for East Boston's first dog park, giving residents a place to bring their dogs. Dedicated on September 14, 2015, the Bremen Street Dog Park is located at the southeast terminus of Bremen Street Park, underneath the Route 1A overpass near the Sumner Tunnel, where the neighborhoods of Jeffries Point and lower Eagle Hill intersect. The $250,000 half-acre dog park is divided into a 17,000-square-foot section for larger dogs and a 5,500-square-foot part for smaller ones, fenced off from each other. Each area has its own dog exercise centers including agility courses, pet waste stations, benches, separate water fountains for dogs and their owners, and benches. Pressley Associates Landscape Architects of Boston designed the park's dog play area with a surface of crushed gravel, replacing the site's original cobblestones. An asphalt track for dog owners to socialize, run around, or watch their dogs at play surrounds the graveled area. The remainder of Bremen Street Park does not allow dogs.

Performance Amphitheater 
In the middle of the park lies an outdoor performance amphitheater; a tiered grassy area for events and performances. At the center of the amphitheater lies a cement platform with a map of East Boston and the original islands that made up the area.

Donald McKay Sculpture 
In the middle of park lies a monument of Donald McKay, an East Boston Resident best known as the builder of clipper ships, including the Flying Cloud. Park designers Brown, Richardson & Rowe worked with a local artist to incorporate this sculpture into the park design.

Surrounding Attractions 
East Boston Memorial Park, operated by the Boston Parks and Recreation Department, abuts Bremen Street Park to the south, which also homes East Boston Memorial Stadium.

The East Boston Greenway Connector at the north-east terminus next to the Boston Public Library, connects Bremen Street Park to Wood Island Bay Marsh, another park along the waterfront in East Boston.

At the south-west terminus of the park is the entrance to the East Boston Greenway, where the shared use path continues south-west to Boston Harbor, eventually leading to Maverick Square and the Jeffries Point neighborhood.

See also 
 East Boston
 East Boston Greenway
 Piers Park
 East Boston Memorial Park
 MassPort

References

External links 
 Boston Harborwalk – East Boston Greenway
 MassPort Open Spaces
 MassPort Parks
 East Boston Walking Tour
 East Boston Greenway
 East Boston Open Space Map and Guide
 Bremen Street Park Design

East Boston
Parks in Boston
Bike paths in Massachusetts
Urban public parks
Logan International Airport